María Martorell Pallás (born 28 March 1942 in Valencia, Spain) is a Spanish politician who belongs to the People's Party (PP).

Martorell holds a doctorate in philosophy. She works as a professor in the faculty of philosophy in the University of Valencia. Politically she served as Director General of University teaching and research in the Valencian regional administration. In March 2000, she was elected to the Spanish Congress of Deputies representing Valencia region but resigned just two months later after being named Minister for the Environment. She has published a number of books and academic works in the education sphere.

Personal life
She is divorced with two daughters.

References

1942 births
Living people
People from Valencia
Members of the 7th Congress of Deputies (Spain)
Politicians from the Valencian Community
People's Party (Spain) politicians
Government ministers of Spain
21st-century Spanish women politicians
20th-century Spanish women politicians
Women government ministers of Spain

ca:Maria José Català Verdet